The NASA Silver Achievement Medal (SAM) is awarded to any government or non-government individuals or teams "for a stellar achievement that supports one or more of NASA's Core Values, when it is deemed to be extraordinarily important and appropriate to recognize such achievement in a timely and personalized manner."

Precedence

References 

Awards and decorations of NASA